Walter Geoffrey Thomas Miller  is a former senior Australian public servant and diplomat, best known for heading the Office of National Assessments between 1989 and 1995.

Life and career
Miller was the Tasmanian Rhodes scholar in 1956, and went on to graduate from the University of Oxford.

In 1989 Miller was appointed head of the Australian Government's intelligence assessment agency, the Office of National Assessments. His tenure at the office, between 1989 and 1995, coincided  with the first Gulf War, the dissolution of the Soviet Union and the beginning of the Yugoslav Wars; and he oversaw intelligence assessment analysts working on developments in these regions as well developments relating to Australia's commitment to United Nations peacekeeping.

In 1995, Miller was appointed Australian High Commissioner to New Zealand, to commence in January 1996.

Miller retired from his diplomatic and Australian Public Service career in 2000.

Awards
In January 1993, Miller was made an Officer of the Order of Australia for public service and service to international relations.

References

Living people
Officers of the Order of Australia
Australian Rhodes Scholars
High Commissioners of Australia to New Zealand
Ambassadors of Australia to Japan
Ambassadors of Australia to South Korea
Year of birth missing (living people)
High Commissioners of Australia to the Cook Islands
People from Tasmania
Alumni of the University of Oxford